Jorma Jaakola (born 13 June 1950) is a Finnish athlete. He competed in the men's javelin throw at the 1976 Summer Olympics.

References

External links
 

1950 births
Living people
People from Raahe
Finnish male javelin throwers
Olympic athletes of Finland
Athletes (track and field) at the 1976 Summer Olympics
Sportspeople from North Ostrobothnia